Lazarus Sangma is a member of Meghalaya Legislative Assembly (MLA) from Chokpot constituency.

Sangma won the 2018 Meghalaya Legislative elections as a candidate from INC party. Later, he joined AITC, quitting Indian National Congress.

References 

Meghalaya MLAs 2018–2023
Year of birth missing (living people)
Living people
Place of birth missing (living people)
Trinamool Congress politicians